Vulvar childhood pemphigoid is a cutaneous condition, a childhood form of bullous pemphigoid, peculiar variant with involvement of the genital area and perineum.

See also 
 Vesicular pemphigoid
 List of cutaneous conditions

References 

Chronic blistering cutaneous conditions